Dennis Te Uhi Marsh  (born 22 February 1951) is a New Zealand country music singer and television presenter, best known for his series of popular albums in the 2010s and for hosting the country music TV show My Country Song. He is New Zealand's best selling country music artist.

Background 

Marsh was born in Te Kuiti, New Zealand in 1951 and has Ngāpuhi and Ngati Hine iwi affiliations. He moved to Auckland to pursue a career as a carpenter, but became involved with Christian music, studied theology and lead a youth ministry. In 1984 Marsh became involved with country music and began performing around New Zealand. He won a number of local awards, and eventually release his debut album, For You, in 1989.

Marsh has since released 29 albums, including two which reached No. 1 on the New Zealand albums chart, four gold albums and six platinum albums. He has won numerous country music awards, including being honoured as the 2011 Country Music Legend at the National Country Music Awards, and inducted into the Golden Guitar Awards Hands of Fame, also in 2011.

In 2013, Marsh hosted the Māori Television country music showcase series My Country Song. This was followed by a compilation album, The Best of My Country Song and a live album, My Country Song – The Showcase Concert, both of which featured songs from Marsh.

In October 2019, Marsh received the Benny Award from the Variety Artists Club of New Zealand, the highest honour for a NZ entertainer. In the 2020 New Year Honours, Marsh was appointed a Member of the New Zealand Order of Merit, for services to music and fundraising.

Discography

Albums

Awards 

|-
| 1997
| Dennis Marsh – Out of Nashville
| New Zealand Music Awards – Best Country Album
|  
|-
| 1998
| Dennis Marsh – Faith
| New Zealand Music Awards – Best Gospel Album
|  
|-
| 2002
| Dennis Marsh – Faded Love
| New Zealand Music Awards – Best Country Album
|  
|-
| 2007
| Dennis Marsh
| National Country Music Awards – Best Selling Country Music Album of the Year
|  
|-
| 2007
| Dennis Marsh
| Australian Country Recording Awards – Overseas Artist Award
|  
|-
| 2008
| Dennis Marsh
| National Country Music Awards – Country Music Male Artist of the Year
| 
|-
| 2009
| Dennis Marsh
| National Country Music Awards – Country Music Male Artist of the Year
|  
|-
| 2009
| Dennis Marsh
| Top Male Vocalist – Variety Artists Club of New Zealand Awards
|  
|-
| 2011
| Dennis Marsh
| National Country Music Awards – Country Music Legend
|  
|-
| 2011
| Dennis Marsh
| Golden Guitar Awards – Hands of Fame
|  
|-
| 2013
| Dennis Marsh
| National Country Music Awards – Country Music Male Artist of the Year
|  
|-
| 2016
| Dennis Marsh - Maori Songbook 2
| New Zealand Music Awards – Best Maori Album
|  
|-
| 2019
| Dennis Marsh
| Benny Award Variety Artists Club of New Zealand
|  
|}

References 

Living people
New Zealand country singers
New Zealand television presenters
1951 births
People from Te Kūiti
20th-century New Zealand male  singers
21st-century New Zealand  male singers
Members of the New Zealand Order of Merit
Māori-language singers